Kahma is a village in Shaheed Bhagat Singh Nagar district of Punjab State, India. The village is administrated by Sarpanch an elected representative of the village.

Demography 
As of 2011, Kahma has a total number of 700 houses and population of 3320 of which 1690 include are males while 1630 are females according to the report published by Census India in 2011. The literacy rate of Kahma is 80.83%, higher than the state average of 75.84%. The population of children under the age of 6 years is 321 which is 9.67% of total population of Kahma, and child sex ratio is approximately 845 as compared to Punjab state average of 846.

Most of the people are from Schedule Caste which constitutes 45.57% of total population in Kahma. The town does not have any Schedule Tribe population so far.

As per the report published by Census India in 2011, 1009 people were engaged in work activities out of the total population of Kahma which includes 887 males and 122 females. According to census survey report 2011, 94.35% workers describe their work as main work and 5.65% workers are involved in marginal activity providing livelihood for less than 6 months.
(Vallage has one mahahasti ram kutyia ) it’s located just out side of Valley on Musapur road.

Education 
The village has a Punjabi medium, co-ed upper primary with secondary/higher secondary school founded in 1940. The school provide mid-day meal as per Indian Midday Meal Scheme. As per Right of Children to Free and Compulsory Education Act the school provide free education to children between the ages of 6 and 14.

Amardeep Singh Shergill Memorial college Mukandpur and Sikh National College Banga are the nearest colleges.

List of schools nearby:
Dashmesh Model School, Kahma
Govt High School, Jhander Kalan
Sat Modern Public School, Mangat Dingrian
Guru Teg Bahadur Model School, Behram
Guru Ram Dass Public School, Cheta
Lovely Public School, Pathlawa

Transport 

See also 
List of villages in India

References

External links 
 Tourism of Punjab
 Census of Punjab
 Locality Based PINCode

Villages in Shaheed Bhagat Singh Nagar district